Chantelle Monique Swaby (born 6 August 1998) is an American-born Jamaican professional footballer who plays as a midfielder for FC Fleury 91 and the Jamaica women's national team.

Career

Amateur/College
Swaby attended and played soccer for Hall High School, Connecticut and Rutgers University, New Jersey.

Club
She previously played for Sky Blue FC of the National Women's Soccer League. In 2021, she signed for Scottish side Rangers. After winning the league with Rangers, Swaby departed and signed a contract through 2024 with FC Fleury 91 of D1 Arkema in France.

International
Born in the United States, Swaby represents the Jamaica women's national team at international level.

Honours

Club
Rangers
 Scottish Women's Premier League: 2021-22

Personal life
Her older sister Allyson Swaby is also a Jamaican international footballer.

References

External links

1998 births
Living people
Citizens of Jamaica through descent
Jamaican women's footballers
Women's association football central defenders
Rangers W.F.C. players
Jamaica women's international footballers
2019 FIFA Women's World Cup players
Pan American Games competitors for Jamaica
Footballers at the 2019 Pan American Games
Jamaican expatriate women's footballers
Jamaican expatriate sportspeople in Scotland
Expatriate women's footballers in Scotland
People from West Hartford, Connecticut
Sportspeople from Hartford County, Connecticut
Soccer players from Connecticut
American women's soccer players
Rutgers Scarlet Knights women's soccer players
NJ/NY Gotham FC draft picks
African-American women's soccer players
American sportspeople of Jamaican descent
American expatriate women's soccer players
American expatriate sportspeople in Scotland
21st-century African-American sportspeople
21st-century African-American women
FC Fleury 91 (women) players